Chauncy Makolani Master (born 2 June 1985 in Mulanje) is a Malawian middle distance runner who specializes in the 1500 metres.

He competed at the 2006 Commonwealth Games, the 2007 World Championships and the 2008 Olympic Games without progressing to the second round.

His personal best times are:
800 metres – 1:49.70 min (2008)
1500 metres – 3:42.73 min (2008)

In 2017, he competed in the senior men's race at the 2017 IAAF World Cross Country Championships held in Kampala, Uganda. He finished in 74th place.

References

External links
 

1985 births
Living people
People from Mulanje District
Malawian male middle-distance runners
Malawian male long-distance runners
Athletes (track and field) at the 2008 Summer Olympics
Olympic athletes of Malawi
Athletes (track and field) at the 2006 Commonwealth Games
Athletes (track and field) at the 2010 Commonwealth Games
Athletes (track and field) at the 2014 Commonwealth Games
Athletes (track and field) at the 2018 Commonwealth Games
Commonwealth Games competitors for Malawi
Athletes (track and field) at the 2019 African Games
African Games competitors for Malawi